Dorcadion albicans is a species of beetle in the family Cerambycidae. It was described by Chevrolat in 1862.

Subspecies
 Dorcadion albicans albicans Chevrolat, 1862
 Dorcadion albicans demandense Escalera, 1902
 Dorcadion albicans marinae Tome & Bahillo, 1996
 Dorcadion albicans palentinum Escalera, 1911
 Dorcadion albicans vanhoegaerdeni Breuning, 1956

See also 
Dorcadion

References

albicans
Beetles described in 1862